Chester W. Nimitz Senior High School is a public secondary school made up of two campuses located in unincorporated Harris County, Texas, United States. The campuses have Houston addresses. The school is located directly across the street from Lone Star College–North Harris and west of Bush Intercontinental Airport The school serves portions of Houston, the Aldine Independent School District portion of Humble, and unincorporated areas of Harris County. Nimitz is one of five comprehensive high schools in Aldine ISD. The main campus serves 10th through 12th grade, while Nimitz Ninth Grade Center serves 9th grade.

History 

Nimitz first opened its doors in the fall of 1978, relieving both Aldine and MacArthur High School. Located near the border of Houston, Spring, and Humble, it was and still is the only high school located in the far northeast region of the Aldine School District. The campus was relieved of its ninth graders with the opening of its freshmen campus in the fall of 1999. Nimitz gained 215 young victims resulting from Hurricane Katrina after the hurricane struck New Orleans, Louisiana, and nearby coastal areas in Louisiana, Mississippi, and Alabama in 2005, and is notable for causing strife between the two differing groups of students, especially soon after the hurricane.

Academics
For the 2018-2019 school year, the school received a B grade from the Texas Education Agency, with an overall score of 80 out of 100. The school received a C grade in two domains, Student Achievement (score of 76) and Closing the Gaps (score of 71), and a B grade in School Progress (score of 84). The school received one of the seven possible distinction designations for Post-secondary Readiness.

Demographics
The ethnic distribution at Nimitz High School for the 2018-19 school year was:
Asian: 1.8%
African American: 42.6%
American Indian: 0.1%
Hispanic: 50.1%
White: 3.6%
Pacific Islander: 1.0%
Two or more races: 0.8%

73.1% of students were Economically Disadvantaged, 9.6% were English Language Learners, and 10.4% received Special Education Services.

Advanced placement and honor courses provided at NHS

Neighborhoods served
While the school has a Houston address, it serves students in portions of unincorporated Harris County, Bordersville, the AISD portion of Humble (including communities such as Inverness Forest, Woodcreek, Memorial Hills, Kenswick, Foxwood, and Deerbrook Estates), and a small portion of East Aldine (areas north of Aldine Bender).

Nimitz serves a Houston Housing Authority (HHA) public housing complex, Mansions at Turkey Creek.

Due to the tremendous growth in the areas serving AISD, the district opened Benjamin O. Davis High School in the Fall of 2012. Davis was built to help alleviate overcrowding at the district's four high schools. The school took in freshmen and sophomore students its first year, phasing in juniors and seniors in the following years. Communities in the Greenspoint area of the Nimitz attendance zone were directly affected by the school's opening.

Notable alumni
 Michael Bourn (MLB)
 Dante Hall (NFL)
 Aaron Glenn (NFL)
 Jason Glenn (NFL)
 Quentin Griffin (NFL)
 Darrick Vaughn (NFL)
 Cartier Martin (NBA)
 Mike Jones (Rapper)
 Michael Thomas (NFL)
 Brittney Griner  (WNBA) (Olympic champion)
 Marion Grice (NFL) 
 Josh Huff (NFL)
 Darrell Stewart Jr. (NFL)

Feeder pattern

Extracurricular activities

References

External links
 
Nimitz Ninth Grade Center (Current)
Nimitz Alumni
Nimitz Cougars on HS Game Time

Public education in Houston
Aldine Independent School District high schools
1978 establishments in Texas
Educational institutions established in 1978